William Holmes Sullivan (1836-1908) was a British painter who mainly painted history paintings, portraits, and war scenes. His works include various paintings based on William Shakespeare's Tragedy of Julius Caesar.

Gallery

External links
 William Holmes Sullivan at Artnet
 William Holmes Sullivan at Art UK

1836 births
1908 deaths
19th-century British male artists
British male painters
19th-century British painters
History painters